Ainay-le-Vieil is a commune in the Cher department in the Centre-Val de Loire region of France.

Geography

Population

Places of interest
 The church, dating from the thirteenth century.
 Château d'Ainay-le-Vieil, dating from the twelfth century.

See also
 Communes of the Cher department

References

Communes of Cher (department)